These are the results of the men's C-1 1000 metres competition in canoeing at the 1952 Summer Olympics.  The C-1 event is raced by single-man sprint canoes. Because there were ten competitors in the event, heats were introduced. Both the heats and final took place on July 28.

Medalists

Heats
The ten competitors first raced in two heats.  The top four finishers in each heat moved directly to the final.

Heat 1

Heat 2

Final

References

1952 Summer Olympics official report. p. 633.
Sports-reference.com 1952 C-1 1000 m results

Men's C-1 1000
Men's events at the 1952 Summer Olympics